"Say My Name" (originally titled "Everybody Wins") is the seventh episode of the fifth season of the American television crime drama series Breaking Bad, and the 53rd overall episode of the series. Written and directed by Thomas Schnauz, it aired on AMC on August 26, 2012.

The title of the episode is a phrase repeatedly spoken by Walt (Bryan Cranston) during his encounter with Declan (Louis Ferreira).

This episode marks Jonathan Banks's final Breaking Bad appearance. Banks and Bryan Cranston both received high praise from critics for their performances. Banks later returned as Mike Ehrmantraut for the Breaking Bad prequel spin-off, Better Call Saul, and starred as a series regular, in addition to the sequel film El Camino: A Breaking Bad Movie.

Plot 
Walter White, Jesse Pinkman, and Mike Ehrmantraut meet with Declan, their Phoenix-based competitor. Instead of agreeing to Declan's offer to purchase the heisted methylamine for $15 million in exchange for removing Walt's blue meth from the drug market, Walt offers a counterproposal: to sell his superior product through Declan's distribution network in exchange for a substantial share of the business and a one-time, $5 million payment to Mike for his share. Declan initially refuses but accepts after realizing Walt is the infamous Heisenberg.

Walt avoids Jesse's attempts to leave with his share of the money. Meanwhile, Mike learns through the bugs that the DEA has a search warrant for his house. He stashes a car with a go bag with cash, a passport, and a gun in an airport parking lot. When Hank and Steve Gomez search his house, they find nothing. Later, Hank instructs Steve to follow Mike's attorney, Dan Wachsberger, catching him in the act of depositing the illegal drug cash.

Jesse confronts Walt and demands his share of the money. Walt angrily accuses Jesse of having nothing in his life, but his attempts to manipulate Jesse fail, and he ultimately leaves without his money, angering Walt further. Walt is forced to cook his next batch of meth with Todd, who proves to be much more subordinate and better at following orders than Jesse. Pretending to be distraught over Skyler White, Walt visits Hank at his office and manages to remove the bugs, but overhears Gomez telling Hank that they have arrested Dan and that he plans on telling everything he knows about Mike. Walt frantically calls Mike, who is at a park with his granddaughter Kaylee, and tells him the DEA is coming for him. Upon the arrival of the police, Mike is forced to flee the park without saying goodbye to Kaylee.

Mike asks Saul Goodman to retrieve the go bag for his getaway, but Saul fears the DEA will follow him. When Jesse volunteers to help, Mike refuses his assistance out of concern that Jesse would be spotted, leaving Walt to retrieve the bag. When Walt meets with Mike, he refuses to hand over the bag unless Mike tells him the names of the nine men he is paying off. Mike takes the bag anyway and a heated argument erupts; in which Mike scolds Walt for his egotistical behavior and accuses him of having ruined their ideal situation working for Gus Fring. Walt storms off, and returns as Mike is about to leave, impulsively shooting him. Mike tries to get away, but – mortally wounded – ultimately resigns himself to sitting on a log by the river. After Walt catches up to him, he realizes he could have just asked Lydia Rodarte-Quayle for the names, and that shooting Mike was unnecessary. Walt attempts to apologize, but Mike tells him to "shut the fuck up and let me die in peace" and succumbs to his wound seconds later.

Production 

The episode was written and directed by Thomas Schnauz and aired on AMC on August 26, 2012.

This episode marks the final Breaking Bad appearance of Mike Ehrmantraut (Jonathan Banks) as a series regular. Show creator Vince Gilligan talked about Mike's death and why it was one of his favorite moments of the series:

 Banks claimed Mike's death did not surprise him because he always believed the character would die at some point. Banks reprised his role as Mike Ehrmantraut in Better Call Saul and El Camino.

Reception

Ratings 
"Say My Name" was watched by 2.98 million viewers and received a 1.4 rating among viewers aged 18–49, the series' highest ratings and viewers at the time.

Critical reception 
The episode received highly positive reviews from critics with many critics singling out Jonathan Banks and Bryan Cranston for particular praise. The episode is recognized by many critics as one of the best in the series. TV Fanatic's Matt Richenthal gave "Say My Name" a five-star rating, calling it "one of the best in series history." Seth Amitin of IGN gave the episode a 9 out of 10 rating, calling it "mind-blowing", but stating that "I hate to see Mike go out like that. He deserved more. I literally can't give this higher than a 9.0, it was just too sad of an ending." Alan Sepinwall of HitFix thought the episode was "a mostly tremendous episode of a drama", adding the death of Mike "is just a gorgeous, devastating scene", but he was unimpressed by the plotting that led to Mike showing any trust for Walt in that situation, writing that it was a contrived way to ensure that Walt would be in a position to kill Mike per the requirements of the overall show story.

Thomas Schnauz was nominated for the Primetime Emmy Award for Outstanding Writing for a Drama Series for writing this episode.

In 2019, The Ringer ranked "Say My Name" as the 8th best out of the 62 total Breaking Bad episodes.

References

External links 
 "Say My Name" at the official Breaking Bad site
 

2012 American television episodes
Breaking Bad (season 5) episodes
it:Di' il mio nome (Breaking Bad)